Thomas Carr (August 9, 1905 – August 19, 1955) was an American sports shooter. He competed in the 25 m rapid fire pistol event at the 1932 Summer Olympics.

References

External links
 

1905 births
1955 deaths
American male sport shooters
Olympic shooters of the United States
Shooters at the 1932 Summer Olympics
Sportspeople from Butte, Montana